Bang Face (often referred to as BangFace) is an insane electronic dance music event that has been taking place at various venues across the UK since 2003. Starting as a monthly club night in London, it has grown to include an annual three-day weekender at Southport, a boat party on the River Thames, as well as guest shows at festivals such as Glastonbury. In 2013 Bang Face celebrated its 10th birthday with DJ Mag stating Bang Face [maintains] "the perfect blend of old skool rave and the finest contemporary leftfield sounds". In March 2015 Bang Face reached the milestone of 100 events by hosting the Weekender at Southport Holiday Park. Resident Advisor asked the question "Is Bangface the most unique rave out there?" and described it as a "Neo-rave utopia".

Description 
Bang Face is known for its fun and creative party atmosphere featuring inflatables being bounced above the crowd, banners bearing comedic slogans and fancy dress themes.  A photo feature illustrating this appeared in the Observer Magazine. It is this atmosphere that has become Bang Face’s unique signature with Time Out London claiming that the 2009 Weekender would “make Bestival look like f***ing ‘Question Time’". Bang Face hosts a wide range of electronic dance music.

Bang Face normally themes its events using historical references to significant events falling on the same day, for example a James Bond-themed fancy dress code for an event coinciding with Roger Moore's birthday party.

London events 
Bang Face began as a monthly club night in London and quickly became increasing popular with a resurgence in electronic dance music.  It gained attention early on with a video endorsement from Ozzy Osbourne who described it as "the Punk Rave Place". Whilst supporting mainly new and upcoming artists, Bang Face began to gain attention in the media. It appeared top of the recommended club features in publications such as NME’s ‘Top clubs to get your rocks off’ and The Guardian Guide: “Bang Face celebrates with luminaries Venetian Snares, A Guy Called Gerald and Hellfish to unleash all manner of mayhem”.  Bang Face also holds an annual boat party on the River Thames.

Weekenders 
After five years of monthly club nights Bang Face launched the first Weekender in 2008, held over three days at Pontins in Camber Sands. Following the success of this event it has now become an annual event. A fly poster for the first Weekender appeared in Channel 4's Shameless as a stage prop.
In 2012 the Bang Face Weekender was held at Trevelgue Holiday Park, Newquay, Cornwall and headlined by Aphex Twin. 
The Bang Face Weekender returned in 2015 to Pontins Holiday Park Southport for the 100th event. The Bang Face Weekender was also held again in April 2016 at Southport.

Festivals and European events 
Bang Face began to host showcase events at UK festivals, starting with The Glade in 2006.  In 2010 it hosted a night at the Glastonbury Festival for the first time, which was ranked ninth in a Daily Telegraph columnist's Top 10 highlights of the festival. BangFace returned to Glastonbury in June 2011. In 2013 - 2014 Bang Face organised events in Belgium and Holland where they have a strong fanbase. This included a takeover at Dour Festival in 2014.

See also
List of electronic music festivals

References

External links 

 
 BANGFACE: A DECADE OF BANGING

Music festivals established in 2003
Club nights
Electronic music festivals in the United Kingdom